Tibiyo Taka Ngwane, meaning wealth of the nation, is a Swazi sovereign wealth fund which was created through royal
charter under the reign of King Sobhuza II in 1968. The company is currently held by King Mswati III in trust for the Swazi nation and is separate from the government.

It was formed by King Sobhuza II at independence in 1968 by Royal Charter to promote and encourage peace and stability, to preserve culture and tradition and to promote a high standard of living for the Swazi Nation through provision of employment. It has stakes in agriculture, property, a printing company, and it is the sole owner of the Eswatini Observer. Tibiyo is a shareholder in many companies such as the Royal Eswatini Sugar Corporation (RES Corporation), Maloma Colliery Limited, Lubombo Sugar, Parmalat Swaziland, Simunye Plaza, Bhuna Mall, Swazi Spar Holdings, Eswatini Beverages, Alexander Forbes, Fincorp, Tibiyo Leisure Resorts trading as Royal Villas and many subsidiaries across the country.

In 2009 a group of Swazi organisations called for Tibiyo Taka Ngwane to be converted to a government department that would be open for public scrutiny.

References

External links
 Official website of Tibiyo Taka Ngwane

Companies of Eswatini
Conglomerate companies established in 1968
1968 establishments in Swaziland